Marambio Airport  is an airport serving Marambio Base, an Argentinian research station on Seymour Island in the Antarctic Peninsula. Marambio is the main air-support node for most local and foreign stations in Argentine Antarctica, providing year-round medical evacuation, search and rescue, personnel, cargo, and mail transfer.

Supplies are taken to the Marambio Base during the whole year for later distribution to other Argentine bases (except for Belgrano II). There are over 100 intercontinental flights every year.

Facilities
The runway is lined with strobe lights. The parking apron provides large cargo aircraft like the Hercules C-130 with access to fuel and concurrent services.

There is a hangar for the Argentine Air Force de Havilland Canada DHC-6 Twin Otter that routinely operates from the base along with two Bell 212s that are deployed during the summer campaigns to support scientific activities and link to other Argentine bases.

See also
Transport in Antarctica
List of airports in Antarctica

References

External links
OurAirports - Marambio Base
FallingRain - Marambio Base Airport

Skiway
Argentine Antarctica
Airports in Graham Land
Airports in Antarctica